There are numerous variations of the color purple, a sampling of which are shown below.

In common English usage, purple is a range of hues of color occurring between red and blue. 
However, the meaning of the term purple is not well defined. There is confusion about the meaning of the terms purple and violet even among native speakers of English. Many native speakers of English in the United States refer to the blue-dominated spectral color beyond blue as purple, but the same color is referred to as violet by many native English speakers in the United Kingdom. The full range of colors between red and blue is referred to by the term purple in some British authoritative texts, whereas the same range of colors is referred to by the term violet in some other texts. 
The confusion about the range of meanings of the terms violet and purple is even larger when including other languages and historical texts. 
Since this Wikipedia page contains contributions from authors from different countries and different native languages, this Wikipedia page is likely to be not consistent in the use of the color terms purple and violet.

In formal color theory, purple colors often refer to the colors on the line of purples on the CIE chromaticity diagram (or colors that can be derived from colors on the line of purples), i.e., any color between red and violet, not including either red or violet themselves.

The first recorded use of purple as a color name in English was in 975 AD.

Historical development of purple

Tyrian purple: Classical antiquity

See also under Purple#In art, history and fashion the section "In prehistory and the ancient world: Tyrian purple" 

"Tyrian purple" is the contemporary English name of the color that in Latin is denominated "purpura". Other contemporary English names for purpura are "imperial purple" and "royal purple". The English name "purple" itself originally denominated the specific color purpura. Purpura is the color of a dye extracted from a mollusk found on the shores of the city of Tyre in ancient Phoenicia (contemporarily in Lebanon), which color in classical antiquity was a symbol of royalty and political authority because only the very wealthy could afford it, including the Roman Emperors. Therefore, Tyrian purple was also denominated "imperial purple".

Tyrian purple may have been discovered as early as during the Minoan civilization. Alexander the Great, when giving imperial audiences as the Emperor of Macedonia; the Emperor of the Seleucid Empire; and the Kings of Ptolemaic Egypt all wore Tyrian purple. The imperial robes of Roman emperors were of Tyrian purple trimmed in metallic gold thread. The badge of office of a Roman Senator was a stripe of Tyrian purple on his white toga. Tyrian purple was continued in use by the Emperors of the Eastern Roman Empire until its final collapse in 1453.

The tone of Tyrian purple displayed above is that tone of Tyrian purple which was the color of "clotted blood", which was considered the tone having the most prestige in ancient Greece and Rome, as recorded by Pliny the Elder. However, the actual tone varied depending on how the dye was formulated. Lesser royal houses that wanted to economize could mix Tyrian purple dye with the much less expensive indigo to create a color closer to violet.

Han purple: Ancient China

Han purple is a type of artificial pigment found in China between 500 BC and AD 220. It was used in the decoration of the Terracotta Army.

Royal purple: 17th century

The color royal purple is a tone of purple that is bluer than the ancient Tyrian purple.

The first recorded use of royal purple as a color name in English was in 1661.

In 1990, royal purple was formulated as one of the Crayola crayon colors.

Mauveine: 1860s–1890s

Mauveine was first named in 1856. Chemist Sir William Henry Perkin, then eighteen, was attempting to create artificial quinine. An unexpected residue caught his eye, which turned out to be the first aniline dye—specifically, Perkin's mauve or mauveine is sometimes called aniline purple. Perkin was so successful in recommending his discovery to the dyestuffs industry that his biography by Simon Garfield is titled Mauve. As mauveine faded easily, our contemporary understanding of mauve is as a lighter, less saturated color than it was originally known.

"Mauveine" was named after the mauve colored mallow flower, even though it is a much deeper tone of purple than mauve.  The term "Mauve" in the late 19th century could refer to either the deep, rich color of the dye or the light color of the flower.  Mauve (meaning Mauveine) came into great vogue when in 1862 Queen Victoria appeared at the Royal Exhibition in a mauve silk gown—dyed with mauveine. By 1890, this color had become so pervasive in fashion that author Thomas Beer used it in the title of his book about the 1890s, The Mauve Decade.

Artists' pigment purple (red-violet): 1930s

In some parts of the world, 'Royal purple' (shown above) or the dark violet color known as generic purple is the common layman's idea of purple, but these color terms carry different meanings in different parts of the world. Even among modern native speakers of English there is confusion about the terms purple and violet. In the United Kingdom, many native speakers of English refer to the blue-dominated spectral color beyond blue as violet, but this color is called purple by many speakers in the United States. 
In some texts the term violet refers to any color between red and blue. However, there are also authoritative texts from the United Kingdom in which this same range of colors is referred to by the term purple. 
When including languages other than English, and epochs other than the modern period, the uncertainty about the meanings of the color terms violet and purple is even larger. Since this Wikipedia page contains contributions from authors from different countries and different native languages, it is likely to be not consistent in the use of the color terms violet and purple.

Artists that  happen to follow Munsell color system (introduced in 1905 and used since 1930 by a large number of artists in the United States, but by much fewer artists outside the US), may regard purple as being synonymous with the red-violet color, represented by the web color medium violet red. Munsell included purple as a color hue in his color system, but he did not do so for violet as he did not need it as a label for his system (just like the hue term orange is not used in Munsell's system). If defined as blue-dominated colors between blue and red, violet colors in Munsell's system would be classified as having the 7.5PB and 10.0PB hue, which is confirmed in visual experiments
 
The truly purple color, defined as being within the range of the red-dominated colors between red and blue, is sometimes confusingly labeled as red-violet color, or more correctly artist's purple. It is the pigment color that would be on a pigment color color wheel between pigment violet and pigment (process) magenta. In the Munsell color system, this color at its maximum chroma of 12 is called Red-Purple, or more specifically Munsell 5RP.

Artists' pigments and colored pencils labeled as purple are typically colored the red-violet color. On an RYB color wheel, the so-called red-violet color is the color between red and violet.

Electric purple: 2000s

This color, electric purple, is precisely halfway between violet and magenta and thus fits the artistic definition of purple.

Using additive colors such as those on computer screens, it is possible to create a much brighter purple than with pigments where the mixing subtracts frequencies from the component primary colors. The equivalent color on a computer to the pigment color red-violet shown above would be this electric purple, i.e. the much brighter purple you can see reproduced on the screen of a computer. This color is pure purple conceived as computer artists conceive it, as the color on the color wheel halfway between color wheel violet and electric magenta. Thus, electric purple is the purest and brightest purple that it is possible to display on a computer screen. Its RGB code is (191, 0, 255).

An old name for this color, used by Robert Ridgway in his 1912 book on color nomenclature, Color Standards and Color Nomenclature, is true purple.

Computer web color purples

Purple (HTML/CSS color) (patriarch)

This purple used in HTML and CSS actually is deeper and has a more reddish hue (#800080) than the X11 color purple shown below as purple (X11 color) (#A020F0), which is bluer and brighter. This is one of the very few clashes between web and X11 colors.

This color may be called HTML/CSS purple. It seems likely that this color was chosen as the web color purple because its hue is exactly halfway between red and blue and its value is exactly halfway between white and black.

A traditional name sometimes used for this tone of purple is patriarch. The first recorded use of patriarch as a color name in English was in 1925.

Purple (X11 color) (veronica)

The color purple, as defined in the X11 color names in 1987, is brighter and bluer than the HTML/CSS web color purple shown above as purple (HTML/CSS color).  This is one of the very few clashes between web and X11 colors.

This color can be called X11 purple.

The traditional name for this tone of purple is veronica. The first recorded use of veronica as a color name in English was in 1919.

Medium purple (X11)

The web color medium purple is a medium shade of the bright X11 purple shown above.

Rebecca purple

Rebecca purple was named after the daughter of CSS pioneer Eric A. Meyer and added to CSS 4.1.

Additional definition of purple

Purple (Munsell)

This color is defined as purple in the Munsell color system (Munsell 5P). The Munsell color system is a color space that specifies colors based on three color dimensions: hue, value (lightness), and chroma (color purity), spaced uniformly in three dimensions in the elongated oval at an angle shaped Munsell color solid according to the logarithmic scale which governs human perception. In order for all the colors to be spaced uniformly, it was found necessary to use a color wheel with five primary colors—red, yellow, green, blue, and purple.

The Munsell colors displayed are only approximate as they have been adjusted to fit into the sRGB gamut.

Additional variations

Pale purple

Pale purple is the pale tint of purple.

Mauve

Mauve  (rhymes with "grove"; from the French form of Malva "mallow") is a pale purple. Mauve is named after the mallow flower. Another name for the color is mallow with the first recorded use of mallow as a color name in English in 1611.

Thistle

Thistle is a light purple resembling the thistle plant.

The first recorded use of Thistle as a color name in English was in 1892.

The color thistle is associated with Scotland because the thistle is the national flower of Scotland and Scotland's highest state decoration is the Order of the Thistle.

Orchid

The color orchid is a bright rich purple. The name 'orchid' originates from the flowers of some species of the vast orchid flower family, such as Laelia furfuracea and Ascocentrum pusillum, which have petals of this color.

The first recorded use of orchid as a color name in English was in 1915.

Heliotrope

The color heliotrope is a brilliant tone of purple; it is a pink-purple tint that is a representation of the color of the heliotrope flower.

The first recorded use of heliotrope as a color name in English was in 1882.

Psychedelic purple (phlox)

The pure essence of purple was approximated in pigment in the late 1960s by mixing fluorescent magenta and fluorescent blue pigments together to make fluorescent purple to use in psychedelic black light paintings. This tone of purple was very popular among hippies and was the favorite color of Jimi Hendrix. Thus it is called psychedelic purple. Psychedelic purple is the color halfway between electric purple and magenta.

In the 1980s, there was a Jimi Hendrix Museum in a Victorian house on the east side of Central Avenue one half block south of Haight Street in the Haight-Ashbury neighborhood of San Francisco which was painted this color.

Another name for this color is phlox, as it is the color of the phlox flower. The first recorded use of phlox as a color name in English was in 1918.

Purple pizzazz

The color purple pizzazz was formulated by Crayola in 1990.

Liseran purple

The first recorded use of liseran purple as a color name in English was in 1912.

Mulberry

The color mulberry is a representation of the color of mulberry jam or pie. This was a Crayola crayon color from 1958 to 2003.

The first recorded use of mulberry as a color name in English was in 1776.

Pearly purple

Pearly purple is one of the colors in the special set of metallic colored Crayola crayons called Silver Swirls, the colors of which were formulated by Crayola in 1990.

Purpureus

This color is named purpureus. Another name for this color is purpura.

The first recorded use its alternative name purpura as a color name in English was in 1382.

Northwestern Purple

Northwestern Purple is the official color of Northwestern University. Additionally, there are shades and tints that are variations of the base color. Northwestern Purple is a custom ink color and can no longer be referenced by a Pantone number.

KSU Purple

For printed material, purple (Pantone #268+) is the official school color of Kansas State University. Traditionally, the school has referred to this darker and bluer shade as Royal Purple. [compare with Royal purple: 17th century] 
 
For the web, #512888 is the official color, even though that hex triplet is not a direct conversion from Pantone 268+.

Pomp and Power

The color pomp and power is not found in the 1930 first edition of the Dictionary of Color by Maerz and Paul, but it is found in the second edition of 1950.

The normalized color coordinates for pomp and power are identical to french lilac, first recorded as a color name in English in 1814.

Mardi Gras

The color name Mardi Gras has been in use since 2001 when the Xona.com Color List was first promulgated.

Eminence

The color name eminence, used since the 1800s, has been in modern use for this color since 2001 when the Xona.com Color List was first promulgated.

Byzantium

The color byzantium is a dark tone of purple.

The first recorded use of byzantium as a color name in English was in 1926.

Pansy purple

The pansy flower has varieties that exhibit three different colors: pansy (a color between indigo and violet), pansy pink, and pansy purple.

The first recorded use of pansy purple as a color name in English was in 1814.

Palatinate

Palatinate is a color (a pale shade of violet) associated with the University of Durham (and with Newcastle University Medical School, this being the former medical school of Durham University.) A separate color, 'Palatinate Blue', is derived from the Coat of Arms of County Durham. The name 'Palatinate' in both instances alludes to the historic status of Durham as a County Palatine.

Dark purple

Dark purple is the dark tone of purple.

See also
 Crimson (color)
 Indigo
 Lists of colors
 Magenta
 Rose (color)
 Ultramarine
 Violet (color)
 Shades of violet

References

 Purple